Vladimir Bodegrajac (born 22 March 1978 in Zagreb), known as Van Bod, is a Croatian composer, pianist and pop singer.

Life and career

After finishing at the Vatroslav Lisinski Music School in Zagreb, he studied piano under Prof. Marina Ambokadze and musicology under Prof Larisa Loginova at the Ino Mirkovich Academy, under the license of the Moscow State Conservatory „P. I. Tchaikovsky“, where he received his master's degree in piano, mentor Prof. Marina Ambokadze.

He finished postgraduate studies of composition at „Komitas“ State Conservatory, Yerevan, Armenia, mentor Prof Armen Smbatyan. He worked as assistant of Prof Armen Smbatyan, rector of the Armenian Conservatory, at the composition department and as assistant of Prof Marina Ambokadze in the piano department of the Ino Mirkovic Academy. In 2005 he moved to Amsterdam, Netherlands, where he worked as a composer, singer and pianist for NTW Productions. Since 2006, he has worked at the UMJETNIČKA ŠKOLA FRANJE LUČIĆA in Velika Gorica, Croatia. He is also composing and performing his own songs and compositions.

Achievements
 Composer of "Call Of Heart" for UNICEF children orchestra, Yerevan, Armenia, 2014
 Composer of UNESCO Children's Foundation "Sea Of Love" anthem, Paris, 1998
 Winner of Emerging composer prize on „Waging Peace Through Singing“ contest, Oregon, USA, 2002
 Performance at “Dora” (Eurovision Song Contest 2004, Croatia) with his own song "Don't cry"
 Works on orchestrations with Stepan Shakaryan - the direct successor and student of Aram Khachaturian
 Private concerts, TV appearances and radio broadcasts performing his own compositions, compositions of classical and modern composers, performing with chamber and symphony orchestras

Discography
 We (2011)
 Destiny (2011) - arranged album in digital distribution

External links
 Vladimir Bodegrajac official website
 Van Bod – at ReverbNation
 NLO studio

Living people
1978 births
Musicians from Zagreb
Croatian pop singers
21st-century Croatian male singers
Composers for piano
Croatian composers
Croatian songwriters
Croatian singer-songwriters
Croatian classical pianists
Male classical pianists
21st-century classical pianists